Borgnone is a hamlet part of the municipality of Centovalli in the district of Locarno in the canton of Ticino in Switzerland. Not to be confused with much bigger Camedo or with Lionza or Costa. It is serviced by the train station of Cadanza-Borgnone.

History

Borgnone is first mentioned in 1364 as Brugnono.
In the Middle Ages it was part of the Locarno region.  In the 15th Century, it became a Degagna, which was part of the bailiwick of Locarno between the 16th Century and 1798.  It then became an independent political municipality when the municipality of Centovalli was split in 1838.

It belonged to the parish of Palagnedra and in 1630 became a vice-parish.  The Church of Beata Vergine dell 'Assunta (built 1364-65) underwent several transformations.

A strong seasonal emigration supplemented the income from agriculture and animal husbandry of the residents. The majority of the population (1990: 70%) is in the services sector, and half of all residences are second or vacation homes.  In 1923 the Locarno-Domodossola rail line was completed.

On 25 October 2009  the former municipalities of Borgnone, Intragna and Palagnedra merged into the municipality of Centovalli.

Location
It is located on the border with Italy. It limits to the North with the Swiss localities of Spruga, Comologno, Crana and Mosogno, to the East with the Swiss locality of Verdasio, to the South with the Swiss localities of Palagnedra, Moneto and Camedo and to the West with Italy. Borgnone's exact location.

References

External links
Borgnone's exact location 
 

Populated places in Switzerland
Former municipalities of Ticino